Reeco Lee Hackett-Fairchild (born 9 January 1998) is an English professional footballer who plays as a winger for Portsmouth.

Career
Hackett was born in the London Borough of Redbridge, and started his career in the youth sides of Fulham and Brighton & Hove Albion. He then joined the Academy side at local side Dagenham & Redbridge in the summer of 2014 to start a two-year scholarship. In March 2016, he joined Isthmian League Premier Division side Dulwich Hamlet on a youth loan and went on to make one appearance in a draw against Wingate & Finchley. At the end of the season he failed to earn a professional contract at Dagenham and was subsequently released. He later joined Norwich City and then Charlton Athletic on a six-week trial. His trial at Charlton proved to be successful and he was rewarded with an initial three-month contract which was later extended until the end of the season. He was part of the under-23 side that won the regional league title and penned a one-year contract extension due to his contribution during the campaign. He made his professional debut in August 2017, replacing Tony Watt as a substitute in the 2–1 victory over Exeter City in the EFL Cup.

He scored his first professional goals when he scored twice in an EFL Trophy tie against Swansea City U21s in December 2017.

On 7 September 2018, Hackett-Fairchild joined National League side Boreham Wood on an initial month's loan.

On 12 March 2019, Hackett-Fairchild joined National League side Bromley on loan until 6 April 2019. During the summer he then joined the club on a permanent basis.

On 6 January 2020, Hackett-Fairchild signed for Portsmouth to bolster their attacking options.

On 21 September 2020, Hackett-Fairchild returned to Bromley on loan. 

On 7 January 2021, Hackett-Fairchild signed for Southend United on loan. Two days later he scored three minutes into his debut against Barrow, which was also his 23rd birthday.

He scored his first goal for Portsmouth in an EFL Cup tie against Millwall on 10 August 2021.

Personal life
Hackett-Fairchild is of Saint Lucian descent through a grandmother.

Career statistics

References

External links

1998 births
Living people
Footballers from the London Borough of Redbridge
English footballers
English people of Saint Lucian descent
Association football forwards
Dagenham & Redbridge F.C. players
Dulwich Hamlet F.C. players
Charlton Athletic F.C. players
Boreham Wood F.C. players
Bromley F.C. players
Southend United F.C. players
English Football League players
Isthmian League players
Black British sportspeople
Portsmouth F.C. players